Zhigansk Airport  is an airport serving the urban locality of Zhigansk, Zhigansky District, in the Sakha Republic of Russia.

Airlines and destinations

References

Airports in the Arctic
Airports in the Sakha Republic